Redhorn may mean:
Red Horn (Siouan deity)
Caradhras, a fictional location: a great peak in the Misty Mountains in The Lord of the Rings
Redhorn Pass over the Misty Mountains in The Lord of the Rings
Redhorn Lake, in Glacier National Park, in the USA state of Montana
Redhorn Peak (8,113 feet (2,473 m)), located in the Livingston Range, Glacier National Park in the USA state of Montana